2009 Collegiate Draft of Major League Lacrosse

Major League Lacrosse Collegiate Draft
Major League Lacrosse